Northern Lions Football Club also known as Northern Lions is a Malaysian football club based in Kangar, Perlis, Malaysia. They currently play in the third-tier division in Malaysian football, the Malaysia M3 League.

History
Founded in 2016, Northern Lions made club debut into Malaysian football by joining the fourth-tier league, 2019 Perlis Amateur League and enter the match final but lost to Tambun Tulang.

Starting from 2020 season, the team will join 2020 Malaysia M3 League and be the first time will participate into the 2020 Malaysia FA Cup competition.

Players

First-team squad

Management team

Club personnel
 Manager: Nur Yusairy Mansor
 Assistant Manager: Muhammad Amer Aeydyd Alias
 Head coach: Azamri Zali
 Assistant coach : Hasriful Syahrum
 Goalkeeping coach: Mohd Amran Omar
 Fitness coach: 
 Physio : Muhammad Idris Zakaria

Season by season record
Updated on 8 June 2020.

Notes:   2020 Season cancelled due to the 2020 Coronavirus Pandemic, no promotion or league title was awarded although this is now subject to a possible legal challenge

 Honours 

 Domestic competitions 
 League 
 Perlis Amateur League'
  Runners-up: 2019

References

External links
Facebook Page

Malaysia M3 League
Football clubs in Malaysia
2016 establishments in Malaysia